Ceropegia elegans is a plant species that belongs to the genus Ceropegia. It is endemic to India and Sri Lanka.

References

External links
 

elegans
Plants described in 1830